Yuriy Fomenko (born 31 December 1986 in Kotelva, Poltava Oblast, Ukrainian SSR) is a professional Ukrainian football striker who plays for FC Rukh Vynnyky.

Fomenko's first trainer was Ihor Bondarenko. He spent large part of his career as a player in different clubs of the Ukrainian First League and the Ukrainian Second League, then was transferred to Azerbaijan Premier League.

In January 2013 Fomenko joined Inter Baku on a six-month contract. Following six-months at Inter Baku, Fomenko moved to fellow Azerbaijan Premier League side AZAL.

On 1 June 2016, Inter Baku announced that Fomenko had left the club after failing to agree on a new contract.

References

External links

1986 births
Living people
Ukrainian footballers
Expatriate footballers in Azerbaijan
Ukrainian expatriate footballers
MFC Mykolaiv players
FC Stal Alchevsk players
FC Helios Kharkiv players
Kapaz PFK players
Shamakhi FK players
FC Prykarpattia Ivano-Frankivsk (2004) players
FC Šiauliai players
FC Alashkert players
FC Poltava players
FC Rukh Lviv players
Expatriate footballers in Lithuania
Expatriate footballers in Armenia
Association football forwards
Sportspeople from Poltava Oblast